The Air of Paris (French: L'air de Paris) is a 1954 French-Italian drama film directed by Marcel Carné and starring Jean Gabin, Arletty and Roland Lesaffre. Gabin won the Volpi Cup at the 1954 Venice International Film Festival.

It was shot at the Billancourt Studios in Paris with sets designed by the art director Paul Bertrand.

Synopsis
An aging former boxer who now runs a training gym with his wife is on the prowl to find a young talent and take him to the top. He is in the process of doing so, but his wife wants him to retire. The young boxer's indecisiveness and weakness for women make him a difficult training prospect.

Cast
Jean Gabin as Victor Le Garrec
Arletty as Blanche Le Garrec
Roland Lesaffre as André Ménard
Marie Daems as Corinne
 Folco Lulli as Angelo Posi
 Maria-Pia Casilio as Maria Posi
 Ave Ninchi as Angela Posi
 Jean Parédès as Jean-Marc
 Simone Paris as Chantal
 Maurice Sarfati as Jojo

References

Bibliography
 Edward Baron Turk. Child of Paradise: Marcel Carné and the Golden Age of French Cinema. Harvard University Press, 1989.

External links

 L' Air De Paris(1954) at Yahoo Movies

1950s sports drama films
1954 films
Films directed by Marcel Carné
Films set in Paris
French sports drama films
1950s French-language films
Italian sports drama films
French boxing films
Films shot at Billancourt Studios
1954 drama films
Italian black-and-white films
French black-and-white films
Italian boxing films
1950s French films
1950s Italian films
French-language Italian films